Top of the Heap is a 1972 American drama film directed by and starring Christopher St. John. It was entered into the 22nd Berlin International Film Festival.

Plot
A Washington D.C. police officer, George Lattimer (St. John) is proud to be one of few African-Americans in the department. However, his peers, or people do not show love for him. When he is passed up for the promotion of sergeant, trouble erupts.

Cast
 Christopher St. John as George Lattimer
 Paula Kelly as Black Chick
 Florence St. Peter as Viola Lattimer
 Leonard Kuras as Bobby Gelman
 John Alderson as Captain Walsh
 Patrick McVey as Tim Cassidy
 Allen Garfield as Taxi Driver
 Ingeborg Sørensen as Nurse Swenson (as Ingeborg Sorensen)
 Ron Douglas as Hip Passenger
 John McMurtry as Dope Dealer
 Damu King as Pot Peddler
 Ji-Tu Cumbuka as Pot Peddler
 Brian Cutler as Rookie Policeman
 Jerry Jones as Club Owner
 Willie Harris as Bouncer

See also
 List of American films of 1972

References

External links

1972 films
1972 drama films
American drama films
Films directed by Christopher St. John
Films set in Washington, D.C.
Films shot in Washington, D.C.
1970s English-language films
1970s American films